Craig Pedersen (born June 13, 1965) is a Canadian basketball coach and the head coach of the Iceland national team, where he coached them at the EuroBasket 2015 and EuroBasket 2017. He is the second longest tenured coach of Iceland behind Einar Bollason.

Playing career
Pedersen played professionally in Denmark from 1989 to 2003 with Horsens BC, Horsens IC and Skovbakken, winning the Danish championship in 1998.

Coaching career
He was the head coach of Svendborg Rabbits from 2003 to 2015 and an assistant coach to the Denmark men's national team from 2004 to 2009. In 2014, he was hired as the head coach of the Iceland men's national team.

On 22 November 2019, Pedersen signed a 3-year contract extension to continue with the Iceland national team.

On 9 November 2022, Pedersen signed another contract extension to continue with the Iceland national team until 2025.

References

1965 births
Living people
Bakken Bears players
Canadian men's basketball coaches
Canadian expatriate sportspeople in Denmark
Simon Fraser Clan men's basketball players
Svendborg Rabbits players
Forwards (basketball)